Gennaro (from the Latin Januarius, meaning "devoted to Janus") may refer to 
 San Gennaro, people and places named for the saint, bishop of Naples
Gennaro (given name)
Gennaro (surname)
DiGennaro Communications, American communications company
The Grand Gennaro, a novel by Garibaldi M. Lapolla